Bo  Nix (born February 25, 2000) is an American football quarterback for the Oregon Ducks. Nix played with the Auburn Tigers from 2019 to 2021 before transferring to Oregon in 2022.

High school career 
Nix was born on February 25, 2000, in Arkadelphia, Arkansas. During his career at Pinson Valley High School, Nix accumulated over 12,000 total offensive yards and 161 touchdowns.

He also won Alabama's Mr. Football Award after his senior season.

College career

Auburn 
As a true freshman, Nix was named the starting quarterback for Auburn's 2019 season opener against Oregon. He led Auburn to a 27–21 come-back win against the Oregon Ducks at AT&T Stadium in Arlington, Texas, on August 31, 2019.

Nix led Auburn to a 9–4 record in his freshman season, winning the Iron Bowl, 48–45 over Alabama. He was voted the SEC's 2019 Freshman of the Year, finishing the campaign with 16 touchdowns and 6 interceptions. He threw for 12 touchdowns and 7 interceptions as a sophomore in 2020.

2021 was an up and down season for Nix, with highlights being leading Auburn to their first win at LSU since 1999 and a win over #10 Ole Miss, while also struggling in certain games and being benched for T. J. Finley in the fourth quarter of a game against Georgia State. Nix suffered a season-ending injury against Mississippi State. He threw for 11 touchdowns and just 3 interceptions in 2021.

Oregon 

At the end of the season, Nix announced he would transfer to the University of Oregon.

College statistics

Family
Nix is the son of Patrick Nix and Krista Nix.

References

External links 
 Oregon profile
 Auburn profile
 

2000 births
Living people
American football quarterbacks
Auburn Tigers football players
Oregon Ducks football players
People from Jefferson County, Alabama
Players of American football from Alabama